Cecilia Skingsley (née Bystedt; born 18 August 1968) is a Swedish banker, economist and journalist. She is the current Head of the BIS Innovation Hub, at the Bank for International Settlements. From November 2019 to August 2022 she was First Deputy Governor of the Sveriges Riksbank, the central bank of Sweden.

Education
Skingsley holds a BA in economics and political science from Stockholm University. She received a financial analyst degree from SSE Executive Education at Stockholm School of Economics (formerly IFL at Stockholm School of Economics) and studied journalism at Poppius School of Journalism in Stockholm.

Career
Skingsley began her career as a radio journalist at SAF Radio City in Stockholm. She became the press secretary at the Swedish Ministry of Finance in 1991, and was the personal spokesperson for Bo Lundgren. She became the press secretary for Carl Bildt in 1994. In 1995 she moved to Dagens industri as a financial journalist. Skingley became the head of FX and fixed income research at Swedbank in 2007, and became a chief economist there in 2013. Skingsley was appointed First Deputy Governor of the Riksbank in November 2019, replacing Kerstin af Jochnick.
In June 2022, she was appointed Head of the BIS Innovation Hub at the Bank for International Settlements. She subsequently left her role as First Deputy Guvernor of Sveriges Riksbank, where she was succeeded by Anna Breman.

References

External links 

 Cecilia Skingsley's CV from Sveriges Riksbank

1968 births
21st-century Swedish journalists
Stockholm University alumni
Living people
Swedish women economists
21st-century Swedish economists
Swedish bankers
Women bankers